John Brockman Crane (born 1973) is an American politician serving as a member of the Indiana Senate from the 24th district. He assumed office on November 9, 2016.

Early life and education 
Crane was born and raised in Martinsville, Indiana. He earned a Bachelor of Arts degree in history and psychology from Taylor University and a Master of Arts in communication and culture from Trinity International University. He also studied Christian apologetics through a program at Wycliffe Hall, Oxford.

Career 
In 2009, Crane founded the Sagamore Leadership Initiative. He was elected to the Indiana Senate in November 2016. Since 2019, Crane has served as the ranking member of the House Education and Career Development Committee.

References 

1973 births
Living people
Republican Party members of the Indiana House of Representatives
People from Martinsville, Indiana
Taylor University alumni
Trinity International University alumni
Republican Party Indiana state senators